Robin Samuel Anton Wagner (born August 31, 1933) is an American scenic designer.

Biography
Wagner was born in San Francisco, the son of Phyllis Edna Catherine (née Smith-Spurgeon) and Jens Otto Wagner. He attended art school and started his career in theatres in that city with designs for Don Pasquale, Amahl and the Night Visitors, Tea and Sympathy, and Waiting for Godot, among others. In 1958, he relocated to New York City, where he worked on numerous off-Broadway productions before making his Broadway debut as an assistant designer for the Hugh Wheeler play Big Fish, Little Fish in 1961. His first solo project was a short-lived 1966 production of The Condemned of Altona by Jean-Paul Sartre.

Wagner's many Broadway credits include Hair, The Great White Hope, Promises, Promises, Gantry, Jesus Christ Superstar, Seesaw, Mack & Mabel, A Chorus Line, Ballroom, On the Twentieth Century, 42nd Street, Dreamgirls, Song and Dance, City of Angels, Victor/Victoria, Angels in America: Millennium Approaches, Angels in America: Perestroika, The Producers, The Boy from Oz, and Young Frankenstein. His work in London's West End includes Crazy For You and Chess.

Wagner's other theatrical work ranges from off-Broadway and regional theatre productions to ballet and opera, including sets for the Metropolitan Opera, the Vienna State Opera, the Hamburg State Opera, the Royal Swedish Opera, the Royal Opera House at Covent Garden, and the New York City Ballet.    
   
Wagner has won the Drama Desk Award for Outstanding Set Design six times out of eleven nominations and the Tony Award for Best Scenic Design three times out of ten nominations.

Wagner has served on the Theatre Advisory Committee for the New York International Festival of the Arts, as a trustee of the New York Shakespeare Festival, and has taught in the graduate theatre arts program at Columbia University. In 2001, Robin Wagner was inducted into the Theater Hall of Fame.

Personal
Wagner is divorced from studio executive Paula Wagner. Wagner is divorced from Joyce Marie Workman. They have three children, Kurt, Leslie, and Christie.

References

External links

American scenic designers
Drama Desk Award winners
Tony Award winners
Artists from San Francisco
1933 births
Living people
Robin Wagner